Gołębie-Leśniewo  is a village in the administrative district of Gmina Andrzejewo, within Ostrów Mazowiecka County, Masovian Voivodeship, in east-central Poland.

The village has a population of 100.

References

Villages in Ostrów Mazowiecka County